Bye-Bye is the first novel by Jane Ransom, for which she won the 1996 New York University Press Prize for Fiction.  It was published by the New York University Press.

Plot
The bisexual, nameless narrator decides to abandon her life with her husband, changing her name and her appearance.  The story follows her obsession with Andorgenie, a mysterious performance artist, and her relationships with different men and women, none of whom she really likes.

External links
Jane Ransom's homepage

1997 American novels
1990s LGBT novels
American LGBT novels
Female bisexuality in fiction
New York University Press books
1997 debut novels